Flinn may refer to:
Flinn (surname), of Irish origin
Flinn, Mississippi
Flinn, West Virginia
Flinn Township, Lawrence County, Indiana, dissolved in 1911

See also
Kelly Flinn incident
Flin, commune in Meurthe-et-Moselle department in France
Flynn (surname)
Flynn (disambiguation)